Saviniano Pérez known as " "Nano Perez" (1907, Melo –1985) was a Uruguayan politician and member of the National Party.

Bibliography
  

1907 births
1985 deaths
People from Cerro Largo Department
National Party (Uruguay) politicians